Cenchrus elegans is a species of plants in the grass family. It is found in Malesia.

References

External links 
 Cenchrus elegans at IPNI
 Cenchrus elegans at Tropicos

elegans
Plants described in 2014